is the oldest radio station in Japan. It is operated by the public broadcaster, NHK. Its programming output, which consists of news, current affairs, local programming, and information programming is broadly similar to the BBC's Radio 4.  NHK Radio 1 is available mainly on AM. The callsign is JOAK in Tokyo. It began broadcasting on March 22, 1925. During World War II, it often broadcast official announcements.

History
The first radio broadcast was on March 22, 1925, at Tokyo High School in Shinshiba-cho, Shiba-ku, Tokyo-shi, Tokyo (currently Shibaura, Minato-ku, Tokyo) by the Tokyo Broadcasting Corporation (later NHK Broadcasting Center: NHK Tokyo Headquarters). In July of the same year, the first broadcasting using radio waves, which had been used only for wireless communication until then, was carried out from the temporary broadcasting station on the premises of the Technical School (the predecessor of the Faculty of Engineering, Chiba University). On the 12th, the main broadcast was started from the transmitting station (near the NHK Museum of Broadcasting) in Atagoyama, the same ward. At the same time, the Osaka Broadcasting Station (Osaka City, NHK Osaka Broadcasting Station) and the Nagoya Broadcasting Station (Nagoya City, NHK Nagoya Broadcasting Station) were also established. On December 1st of the following year, the Osaka Broadcasting Station started broadcasting on December 1st of the following year.

In August 1926, the three stations merged to form the Japan Broadcasting Corporation, and from the following year radio stations were established in regional areas, starting with Sapporo, Sendai, Hiroshima, and Kumamoto, and radio broadcasting was carried out nationwide. Initially, there was only one channel, but in April 1931, the second broadcast was opened and the two-channel system was established, and the existing channel was designated as the first broadcast. After that, from 1939, in order to clarify the channel organization of the 1st and 2nd broadcasts, the 1st broadcast was a "national broadcast" that broadcasts programs common throughout the country, and the 2nd broadcast was an advanced broadcast for intelligent people living in cities. It was broadcast as a "city broadcast" mainly for education and lecture programs.

Programming schedule 
05:00 am: RRI Programa 3

07:00 am: NHK Morning News

Frequencies
Tokyo: 594 kHz (Power: 300 kW: 2020: 500 kW)
Osaka: 666 kHz (Power: 500 kW)
Sapporo: 567 kHz (Power: 100 kW)
Fukuoka: 612 kHz (Power: 100 kW)
Nagoya: 729 kHz (Power: 50 kW; 2020: 300 kW)

Hakodate: 675 kHz (Power: 5 kW)

Niigata: 837 kHz (Power: 10kw)

Nagano: 819 kHz (Power: 5 kW)

Kofu: 927 kHz (Power: 5 kW)

Muroran: 945 kHz (Power: 5 kW)

Asahikawa: 621 kHz (Power: 10 kW)

Oita: 639 kHz (Power: 5 kW)

Okinawa: 549 kHz (Power: 1 kW)

Saga: 963 kHz (Power:

See also
NHK Radio 2
NHK General TV
NHK FM Broadcast

References

NHK
Broadcasting in Japan
Publicly funded broadcasters
Radio stations established in 1925
1925 establishments in Japan
Japanese radio networks
News and talk radio stations